Frank Marshall Sibbles (15 March 1904 in Oldham, Lancashire – 20 July 1973 in Bramhall, Cheshire) was a bowler who represented Lancashire in first-class cricket from 1925 to 1937. 

He started off playing cricket for Werneth Cricket Club in the Central Lancashire Cricket League. It was during this period that he was chosen to represent Lancashire as a replacement for Cecil Parkin, who had left the club to play league cricket. As well as bowling off spin, Sibbles sometimes bowled medium pace and using off-cutters, regularly opened the bowling for Lancashire in the 1930s. In his final season for Lancashire, Sibbles' bowling was affected by a knee injury and he was forced to retire. According to Wisden, he was "one of the most consistent cricketers without a major representative honour to his name". 

After retiring from playing, Sibbles joined the Lancashire committee, and at one point was a member of the board of selectors which chose the Lancashire team. On 20 July 1973, Sibbles died suddenly at his home in Bramhall, although he had been ill for several years.

References

External links
 Cricinfo player profile

1904 births
1973 deaths
English cricketers
Lancashire cricketers
People from Oldham
Players cricketers
English cricketers of 1919 to 1945
North v South cricketers